The term needlegrass may refer to any of several genera of grasses, including:

Achnatherum
Aristida (three-awns)
Hesperostipa
Nassella
Stipa
Triraphis

See also
 Spear grass (disambiguation)
 Wiregrass (disambiguation)